is the sixth studio album by Japanese jazz fusion band T-Square, who was then known as The Square. It was released on November 21, 1982. This is also the first T-Square album to have a Japanese name, whereas the previous names were in English.

Track listing
Sources

References

T-Square (band) albums
1982 albums